Ciboneya is a genus of Caribbean cellar spiders that was first described by B. A. Huber & A. Pérez G. in 2001.

Species
 it contains four species, found only on the Greater Antilles:
Ciboneya antraia Huber & Pérez, 2001 – Cuba
Ciboneya nuriae Huber & Pérez, 2001 (type) – Cuba
Ciboneya odilere Huber & Pérez, 2001 – Cuba
Ciboneya parva Huber & Pérez, 2001 – Cuba

See also
 List of Pholcidae species

References

Araneomorphae genera
Pholcidae
Spiders of the Caribbean